Paramesiodes geraeas is a species of moth of the  family Tortricidae. It is found in South Africa, where it has been recorded from Gauteng.

References

Endemic moths of South Africa
Moths described in 1909
Archipini